Ivan Volodymyrovych Kohut (born 31 August 1998) is a Ukrainian professional footballer who plays as a left midfielder for Ukrainian club Karpaty Lviv.

Personal life 
He is the twin brother of Mykola Kohut.

References

External links
 Profile on Ahrobiznes Volochysk official website
 

1998 births
Living people
People from Zboriv
Ukrainian footballers
Association football midfielders
FC Krystal Chortkiv players
FC Ahrobiznes Volochysk players
FC Karpaty Lviv players
Ukrainian First League players
Ukrainian Second League players
Ukrainian twins
Twin sportspeople
Sportspeople from Ternopil Oblast